Tarouf Abdulkhair Adam Muhammad al-Talal Hawsawi, known professionally as Etab, (December 30, 1947 – August 19, 2007) was a Saudi Arabian singer active from the 1960s to the 1990s. Of Hausa descent, she was born in Saudi Arabia, but moved to Egypt soon after her second marriage to an Egyptian man in 1978. Many Arab music historians agree that she was forced out of Saudi Arabia at the orders of then Saudi King Khalid due to her musical concerts considered risqué in Saudi Arabia at that time. In 1983 she became an Egyptian citizen.

Considered one of the first female Saudi singers, Etab started singing in the 1960s, and performed at weddings with Sarah Osman and the ʻoud player Hayat Saleh. She recorded more than 15 albums and appeared in three movies. She became ill with cancer in 1997, and died in Cairo on 19 August 2007. 

Etab was an advocate for women in music, and member of the Union of Arab Artists and the Musicians Syndicate in Egypt. On December 30, 2017, Google designed a Doodle commemorating what would have been her 70th birthday.

See also 
 Arabic music
 Ibtisam Lutfi
 Khaliji music
 Music of Saudi Arabia
 Culture of Saudi Arabia

References 

1947 births
20th-century Saudi Arabian women singers
2007 deaths
Saudi Arabian people of African descent